Peritrichocera tsilaosa is a species of moth in the Carposinidae family. It is found on La Réunion.

References

Natural History Museum Lepidoptera generic names catalog

Carposinidae